Abdoulaye 'Dialla' Coulibaly (born 29 December 1976 in Sirana) is an Ivorian footballer, who plays as a defender. He also holds French citizenship.

External links

1976 births
Living people
Ivorian footballers
Association football defenders
Ligue 2 players
Racing Besançon players
Clermont Foot players
Nîmes Olympique players
FC Martigues players
Ivorian expatriate footballers
Expatriate footballers in France
SO Romorantin players
ES Uzès Pont du Gard players
People from Denguélé District